ENTER eTourism Conference, an international conference by The International Federation for IT and Travel & Tourism (IFITT). 
ENTER conferences papers undergo a blind peer-review, Proceedings are published in a book titled "Information and Communication Technologies in Tourism [YEAR]" by Springer.

Previous ENTER conferences 
1994 Innsbruck, Austria (January 12–14, 1994)
1995 Innsbruck, Austria (January 18–20, 1995)
1996 Innsbruck, Austria (January 17–19, 1996)
1997 Edinburgh, United Kingdom (January 22–24, 1997)
1998 Istanbul, Turkey (January 21–23, 1998)
1999 Innsbruck, Austria (January 20–22, 1999)
2000 Barcelona, Spain (April 26–28, 2000)
2001 Montreal, Canada (April 24–27, 2001)
2002 Innsbruck, Austria (January 22–25, 2002)
2003 Helsinki, Finland (January 29–31, 2003)
2004 Cairo, Egypt (January 26–28, 2004)
2005 Innsbruck, Austria (January 25–28, 2005)
2006 Lausanne, Switzerland (January 18–20, 2006)
2007 Ljubljana, Slovenia (January 24–26, 2007)
2008 Innsbruck, Austria (January 23–25, 2008)
2009 Amsterdam, The Netherlands (January 28–30, 2009)
2010 Lugano, Switzerland (February 10–12, 2010)
2011 Innsbruck, Austria (January 26–28, 2011)
2012 Helsingborg, Sweden (January 24–27, 2012)
2013 Innsbruck, Austria (January 22–25, 2013)
2014 Dublin, Ireland (January 21–24, 2014)
2015 Lugano, Switzerland (February 3–6, 2015)
2016 Bilbao, Spain (February 2–5, 2016)
2017 Rome, Italy (January 24–27, 2017)
2018 Jönköping, Sweden (January 24-26, 2018)
2019 Nicosia, Cyprus (January 30–February 1, 2019)
2020 Guildford, UK (January 8–10, 2020)
2021 Virtual Conference (January 19-22, 2021)

External links 
 ENTER21@yourplace website: https://enter-conference.org
 IFITT official website: http://www.ifitt.org

International conferences